Phyllonorycter parvifoliella is a moth of the family Gracillariidae. It is known from France and Portugal.

The larvae feed on Adenocarpus complicatus. They mine the leaves of their host plant. They create an upper-surface tentiform mine that causes the leaf to contract strongly upwards. Mined leaves are completely eaten out and become whitish. Pupation takes place within the mine.

References

parvifoliella
Moths of Europe
Moths described in 1875